The Aloha 34 is a Canadian sailboat that was designed by Edward S. Brewer and Robert Walstrom as a cruiser and first built in 1975. The boat was renamed the Aloha 10.4 in 1981, after its approximate length overall in metres.

Production
The design was built by Ouyang Boat Works in Whitby, Ontario, Canada, from 1975, under its Aloha Yachts brand, but it is now out of production. From 1981 it was sold as the Aloha 10.4.

Design
The Aloha 34 is a recreational keelboat, built predominantly of fibreglass with a balsa-cored deck and with wood trim. It has a masthead sloop rig, a raked stem, a slightly angled transom, a skeg-mounter rudder, controlled by a wheel and a fixed swept fin keel or optional shoal draft keel. It displaces  and carries  of lead ballast. A tall rig was also available.

The Aloha 10.4 version has a  Westerbeke diesel.

The design has sleeping accommodation for five people, with a double "V"-berth in the bow cabin, two settee berths in the main cabin and a quarter berth on the port side under the cockpit. The galley is located on the port side at the companionway ladder. The galley is "U"-shaped and is equipped with a two-burner stove, an ice box and a sink. The head is located just aft of the bow cabin on the port side.

Operational history
The boat is supported by an active class club, the Aloha Owners Association. It was also at one time supported by the Aloha 34 Owners Club, but it no longer exists.

See also
List of sailing boat types

References

Keelboats
1970s sailboat type designs
Sailing yachts
Sailboat type designs by Edward S. Brewer
Sailboat type designs by Robert Walstrom
Sailboat types built by Ouyang Boat Works